Emericella olivicola  is a fungus. Its ascospores have star-shaped equatorial crests. It was isolated from olives in Italy.

See also
Emericella discophora
Emericella filifera
Emericella stella-maris

References

Trichocomaceae
Fungi described in 2008